The Athletics Norfolk Island (ANI),  also known as Norfolk Island Athletics Association, is the governing body for the sport of athletics in Norfolk Island. Current president is former hammer thrower Brentt Jones.

History 
ANI was founded in 1993 and was affiliated to the IAAF in 1995.

Affiliations 
ANI is the national member federation for the Norfolk Island in the following international organisations:
International Association of Athletics Federations (IAAF)
Oceania Athletic Association (OAA)
Moreover, it is part of the following national organisations:
Norfolk Island Amateur Sports and Commonwealth Games Association
which is the body responsible for the Norfolk Island's representation at the Commonwealth Games.

National records 
ANI maintains the Norfolk Island records in athletics.

See also

Sport in Norfolk Island

References

External links

Norfolk Island
Sport in Norfolk Island
Athletics in Norfolk Island
National governing bodies for athletics
Sports organizations established in 1993
National sports teams of Norfolk Island